Kaduna State University is located in Kaduna, Kaduna State, Nigeria. It was established in 2004. It has seven faculties with over 39 departments and a library that contains over 17,000 volumes of books. It has two campuses: Kafanchan and Kaduna.

History 

The Kaduna State University was established under the Kaduna State law promulgated in May 2004. The promulgation followed the need of boosting higher education in the northern and the southern parts of the state. Consequently, two campuses were approved: one in Kaduna and the other in Kafanchan. The Kaduna campus took off first, running basic degree programmes. Dr. Ahmed Mohammed Makarfi, the then executive governor of Kaduna State and Visitor to the university, appointed Professor Idris Abdulkadir to be the pro-chancellor and chairman of the Governing Council while Professor Abubakar Sani Sambo was appointed the first vice-chancellor. Professor Aminu S. Mikailu, took over from Professor Sambo as second vice-chancellor when the latter was appointed by the Federal Government to head the Nigerian Energy's Commission. Professor Ezzeldin Muktar Abdurahman was the third VC, Professor W.B Quirix was appointed as the fourth VC before Professor Muhammad Tanko (2017-2021). Professor Yohanna Tella was Acting VC from January to June, 2022. The current Acting Vice Chancellor is Professor Abdullahi Musa Ashafa, who took over on 22 June 2022. His Royal Highness, Sanusi Lamido Sanusi is the current Pro-chancellor, while Hussaini Adamu Dikko is the Chairman of the Governing Council. Malam Nasir El- Rufai, the Government of Kaduna state approved the appointment of Abdullahi Ibrahim Musa as the present VC  on 19 October, 2022.

Kaduna State University Library 
The Library is an academy that was established in 2004  to support teaching, learning and research of the university.

Administration

Kaduna State University has a chancellor as its ceremonial head, while the vice-chancellor is  thethe chief executive and academic officer, like in other Nigerian Universities. The vice-chancellor is usually appointed for a five-year, non-renewable term. The current acting vice-chancellor, Professor Abdullahi Musa Ashafa, took office on 22 June 2022. Below is the tabulated list of all KASU vice-chancellors. The number 4, 6, 8 and 9 are all acting vice chancellors, pending substantive appointment of a VC by the university's governing council.

Faculties
The university has seven faculties and a college of medicine:

Faculty of Arts

The Faculty of Arts is among the pioneer faculties of the university, established in 2005. It has seven departments.

The Faculty of Arts comprises the following departments at the Kaduna Campus:

 Arabic
 Christian Religious Studies
 English And Drama
 French
 History
 Islamic Studies
 Nigerian Languages & Linguistics

Faculty of Science

The Faculty of Science is among the pioneer faculties of the university, established in 2005. The Faculty of Science currently comprises the following departments at the Kaduna Campus:

 Biochemistry
 Biological Sciences
 Chemistry
 Geography
 Mathematical Sciences
 Microbiology
 Physics
 Computer science
 Industrial chemistry
 Statistics
 Geology

College  of Medicine

The College of Medicine, Kaduna State University was established in 2008 with the vision to produce medical doctors and other health personnel who understand the normal and abnormal human body, the family and the society, with enough scientific knowledge to undertake further training to become specialists, teachers, and researchers.

Its mission is to train medical doctors and other health personnel of high medical standard who will man the health services in Kaduna State and other parts of Nigeria, who can practice in the community and primary healthcare setting, who can practice in any part of the world, are able to undertake further training to become specialists, and are able to carry out scientific research for the benefit of humanity.

The College of Medicine has one department:

 Medicine
The Barau Dikko teaching hospital is meant for training pharmacy and medical students.

Faculty of Pharmaceutical Sciences

The Faculty of Pharmaceutical Sciences was established in 2012. The founding dean of the faculty is Dr. Ahmed Tijjani Mora. It has five departments:
 Department of Pharmacology and Toxicology
 Department of Clinical Pharmacy and Pharmacy Management
 Department of Pharmaceutical Chemistry and Medicinal chemistry
 Department of Pharmacognosy and Drug Development
 Department of Pharmaceutics and Pharmaceutical Microbiology.

Faculty of Social Sciences  
The  Faculty of Social Sciences is among the pioneer faculties of the university, established in 2005. The Faculty of Social Sciences comprises the following departments at the Kaduna Campus:

 Economics
 Mass Communication
 Political Science
 Sociology
 International relation and diplomacy

Faculty of Management Sciences 

The Faculty of Management Sciences is also among the pioneer faculties of the university, established in 2005. The Faculty of Management Sciences comprises the following departments at the Kaduna Campus:

Accounting
Business Administration
Banking and Finance 
Entrepreneurship
Marketing 
Public Administration

Faculty of Environmental Sciences

The Faculty of Environmental Sciences is one of the newest faculties, established in 2012, and is one of the two faculties on the Kafachan Campus. It has four departments:

 Estate Management 
 Quantity Surveying 
 Environmental Management 
 Architecture

Faculty of Agriculture
The Faculty of Agriculture is one of the newest faculties, established in 2012, and is one of the two faculties on the Kafachan Campus. It has three department:
 Agricultural Economics and Extension
 Animal Science
 Crop Science

 Agriculture

College of Basic and Remedial Studies 

The College of Basic and Remedial Studies has two campuses: the main campus at Maiduguri Road, Kaduna and the other in Kafanchan. The main campus was established in 2004 and the Kafanchan campus in 2012. Basic and Remedial Studies is a pre-degree training programme aimed at producing well-trained candidates from the university's catchment areas and other Nigerians. The programme is essentially for candidates who could not gain university admission through JAMB due to low Unified Tertiary Matriculation Examination (UTME) scores.

The duration of the Basic and Remedial Studies programme is nine months which is equivalent to one academic session of intensive teaching by qualified teachers.

Objectives
The main objectives of the Remedial Programme are

 to prepare candidates to remedy their O Levels deficiencies through WAEC and NECO examinations
 to prepare candidates to pass their UTME examination
 to coach candidates to pass their Post UTME examination
 to prepare candidates for the challenges of academic life in university

All these would be achieved through the provision of qualified, experienced and dedicated teachers by the university.

Admission requirements

Basic Programme

Candidates for this programme must possess not less than 5 credits in their WASSCE/SSCE/NECO examinations.

Science: Candidates for the science programme should have credits in English, Mathematics and any other 3 of the following subjects: Biology, Chemistry, Physics and Geography. The 5 credits above must have been obtained in not more than 2 sittings.

Humanities: Candidates for the arts programme should have credits in English, Mathematics and any other 3 of the following subjects: Economics, Government, History and Literature in English. The 5 credits above must have been obtained in not more than 2 sittings.

For both categories, applicants must write the annual JAMB/UTME with relevant subject combination and must obtain the minimum pass mark approved by the Federal Government.

Remedial Programme

Science: Candidates for this programme must possess a minimum of 3 credits in not more than 1 sitting in the following subjects: English Language, Mathematics, Biology, Chemistry, Physics and Geography.

Humanities: Candidates for this programme must possess a minimum of 3 credits in not more than 1 sitting in the following subjects: English Language, Mathematics, Economics, Government, History and Literature in English.

Candidates admitted for the Remedial programme are expected to register and pass SSCE or NECO in the subjects they are deficient.

Candidates will not be allowed to register for subjects that have not been attempted at O Level.

Arabic-French Preliminary Studies Programme

Objectives
The main objectives of the Arabic-French Preliminary Studies Programme include:

To prepare candidates to pass their UTME examination.
To coach candidates to pass their Post UTME examination.
To prepare candidates for the challenges of academic life in university.

All these would be achieved through the provision of qualified, experienced and dedicated lecturers.

Admission requirements
For Arabic and French, the admission requirement is at least five credits including English Language in WAEC/NECO Examinations in not more than 2 sittings.

In addition to the above requirements, all prospective candidates must register and sit for the Unified Tertiary Matriculation Examination (UTME).

School of Postgraduate Studies
The school admits students for postgraduate diploma, master's degree and PhD.
The functions of the school are as follows:

 Coordinate postgraduate programmes of the university including planning, coordination, administration and admission into programmes of study.
 Recommend the provision of facilities for postgraduate work, regulation and disbursement of funds for postgraduate activities.
 Enhance the quality of postgraduate instructions and research in the university.
 Publicize the postgraduate activities of the university to attract recognition, financial and other support from governments, industries and other agencies.

The university has four faculties for the postgraduate (PG) programme:
Faculty of Arts
Faculty of Science
Faculty of Social Sciences 
Faculty of Management Sciences.

People

Notable alumni 
 Hafsat Mohammed Baba
 Kenneth Bitrus David
 Yunusa Adamu Ugya

Notable faculty  
 Professor Adamu Idris Tanko
 Professor A. A. Adepetu
 Prof. Mohammed Nasir Sambo
 Aondover Augustine Tarhule
 Doctor Caleb Mohammed

Holders of Honorary Degrees 
 Muhammadu Buhari
 Aliko Dangote
 Nasir El-Rufai
 Mrs Zainab Shamsuna Ahmed
 Alhaji Muhammad Maigari Dingyadi
 Malam Mele Kyari
 Seinde Fademi Oladapo
  Amb. Suleiman Dauda Umar

References

External links
Kaduna State University official website
Kaduna State University portal

Universities and colleges in Kaduna State
Educational institutions established in 2004
2004 establishments in Nigeria